Khuda Zameen Se Gaya Nahin Hai is a 2009 Pakistani television series first broadcast simultaneously on PTV Home and Hum TV. It is written by Asghar Nadeem Syed and directed by Kashif Nisar. The cast of the series include Nauman Ijaz, Syed Jibran, Ayesha Khan, Sara Chaudhary, Ayub Khoso and Rasheed Naz. The series revolves around the terrorism in the tribal areas of the Pakistan and army's struggle to eliminate it. The title track of the series was performed by Rahat Fateh Ali Khan.

At 9th Lux Style Awards, the series received five nominations and winining two including Best Television Play - Terrestrial and Best Television Writer.

Plot 

The series highlights the struggle of Pakistan's army to cope with terrorism in the tribal and northern areas. The story revolves around the some "unknown" terrorist agents who cause destruction by terrorist importations which not only effect the peace of the region but the human psyche and relationships also.

Cast 

 Syed Jibran
 Nauman Ijaz
 Ayub Khoso
 Rasheed Naz
 Ayesha Khan
 Sara Chaudhary
 Erum Akhtar
 Adnan Shah Tipu
 Mubashira Khanam

Soundtrack 

The official soundtrack of the series "Khuda Zameen Se Gaya Nahin Hai" was performed by Rahat Fateh Ali Khan, with music composition by Sahir Ali Bagga and lyrics by Imran Raza.

Production 

The series jas been shot in the areas of Jehlum, Islamabad, Bahawalpur, Rahim Yar Khan and North-West Frontier Province.

Awards and nominations

References 

2009 Pakistani television series debuts